Bashair Obaid Al-Manwari (born 13 March 1997) is a Qatari athlete. She competed in the women's 100 metres event at the 2020 Summer Olympics.

References

External links
 

1997 births
Living people
Qatari female sprinters
Athletes (track and field) at the 2020 Summer Olympics
Olympic athletes of Qatar
Place of birth missing (living people)